A chirograph is a medieval document, which has been written in duplicate, triplicate or very occasionally quadruplicate (four copies) on a single piece of parchment, with the Latin word chirographum (occasionally replaced by some other term) written across the middle, and then cut through to separate the parts.  The term also refers to a papal decree whose circulation is limited to the Roman curia.

Etymology
The Latin word chirographum, often spelled cirographum or cyrographum in the medieval period, is derived from the Greek χειρόγραφον, and simply means "handwritten".

Description
The intention of the chirograph was to produce two (or more) identical written copies of a legal agreement, that could be retained by each party to the transaction, and if necessary verified at a later date through comparison with one another. Whereas Charters were typically used for titles of property and did not give each party a copy, chirographs could be used for almost any legal agreement – for example, matters of state, land transfers, repayments of loans, marriage settlements, etc. The cut itself would generally be made with a wavy or serrated edge, running through the word chirographum, to allow the copies to be matched physically as a safeguard against forgery. The earliest surviving portion of a chirograph in England dates from the middle of the ninth century.

The practice of separating the copies with an irregular cut also gave rise to the description of the documents as "indentures", since the edges would be said to be "indented". In the post-medieval period, as legal documents grew in length and complexity, it became impractical to fit two duplicate texts onto a single sheet of parchment. It therefore became more usual to make the two copies on two or more separate sheets, the top edges of which were still cut with a symbolic or matching wavy line.

Ecclesiastical use

A more restricted use of the term is to describe a papal decree whose circulation—unlike an encyclical—is limited to the Roman curia.

Pope Francis on 26 June 2013 used a chirograph to set up a Commission to investigate the decisions and underlying investments of the Institute for the Works of Religion (the so-called "Vatican Bank"). The document was "an instrument under canon law giving the commission legal force, and expressing its broad aim to help ensure that 'the principles of the Gospel also permeate activities of an economic and financial nature.'"

See also
Indenture, a similar document recording an important agreement, formerly including slavery and apprenticeships, latterly in relation to certain major land dealings or certain debts of money, retained in a few and dwindling number of jurisdictions
Fine of lands, or final concord, a type of property conveyance in chirograph form common in medieval and post-medieval England
Tally stick, or split tally, a comparable system of creating matching copies of simple accounting records on a split stick

References
Bedos-Rezak, Brigitte (2010). "Cutting Edge: The Economy of Mediality in Twelfth-Century Chirographic Writing.” In Das Mittelalter 15: 134-161.

Notes

External links
Chirographs, Indentures and Final Concords Medieval Writing. Retrieved on August 7, 2008.
Vatican page on Chirographs

Catholic canonical documents
Documents of the Roman Curia